Alt is a surname. Notable people with the surname include:

Albrecht Alt (1883–1956), German bible scholar and Protestant theologian
Carol Alt (born 1960), American model and actress
Don Alt (1916-1988), American politician and businessman
Ernst Alt, German Roman Catholic priest and exorcist
Helmut Alt, German computer scientist
J. Kenji López-Alt, American chef and food writer
Jakob Alt (1789–1872), Austrian painter, father of painters Franz and Rudolf
Franz Alt (mathematician) (1910–2011), Austrian-born American mathematician
Franz Alt (painter) (1821–1914), Austrian painter, brother of Rudolf
Renata Alt (born 1965), German politician
Rudolf von Alt (1812–1905), Austrian painter
Salome Alt (1568–1633), Austrian wife of Wolf Dietrich (von) Raitenau
Susanne Alt (born 1978), German female saxophonist

See also

Ant (name)

German-language surnames
Surnames from nicknames